The Venerable Aaron Wilson  (16 October 1589 – 28 March 1643) was an Anglican clergyman and divine.

Life 
Aaron Wilson matriculated from Queen's College, Oxford, on 16 October 1607, as "cler. fil. æt. 18". He graduated MA in 1615, and D.D. on 17 May 1639. He held the living of St Stephen's, Walbrook: he was collated rector in December 1625. He was appointed chaplain to Charles I and installed Archdeacon of Exeter in January 1634; in this same year he became vicar of Plymouth (St. Andrew's), to which benefice he was instituted by Charles I. He and his flock quarrelled over temporalities, and he took proceedings in the Star-chamber, but failed to prove the alleged encroachments. The corporation, nevertheless, thought it wise to surrender the right of presentation to the King, who regranted it under conditions. When the Civil War broke out, the vicar was sent prisoner by the townsfolk to Portsmouth; he died at Exeter in July 1643, bequeathing to his son an unswerving faith in the greatness of royal prerogative.

References

Bibliography 

 

Exeter Cathedral
17th-century English Anglican priests
Archdeacons of Exeter
Alumni of The Queen's College, Oxford
1589 births
1643 deaths